John W. Morgan, (born May 7, 1964), is a Canadian lawyer, politician, and businessman. He was the mayor of the Cape Breton Regional Municipality (CRBM) in Nova Scotia from 2000 to 2012.

Morgan is a graduate of the University College of Cape Breton and St. Francis Xavier University, where he received a bachelor of science degree, majoring in chemistry and minoring in mathematics. He attended Dalhousie University, where he obtained a master's degree in business administration and a bachelor's degree in law under the combined MBA/LLB degree program, graduating in 1990.

First elected in October 2000, Morgan has since been re-elected twice (in 2004 and 2008) with over 80% of the votes cast.

Morgan filed a lawsuit on behalf of CBRM against the Government of Nova Scotia alleging unequal per capita provincial funding for his municipality. Morgan had applied to the Nova Scotia Utility and Review Board to reject the Boundary Review citing the citizenry want a downsized municipal council. The eventual decision was that the Boundary Review was flawed and will need to be re-done by 2010.

On August 17, 2012, Morgan released a statement announcing that he would not re-offer in the 2012 municipal election. He was succeeded as mayor by Cecil Clarke.

In February 2020, Morgan announced he would run for the New Democratic Party nomination in Glace Bay-Dominion for the following Nova Scotia general election, which was ultimately held on August 17, 2021.

References

Mayors of Cape Breton Regional Municipality
People from Glace Bay
Canadian people of British descent
Living people
1964 births
St. Francis Xavier University alumni
Dalhousie University alumni